This is a list of space travellers by first flight. The table is listed in chronological order from the date of first flight. The criteria for determining who has achieved human spaceflight vary.

Space travellers

Table parameters

All entries are dated from launch time in Coordinated Universal Time (UTC), which on occasion is one day earlier than the local date of launches from sites in the Eastern Hemisphere such as Baikonur and one day later than the local date of launches from sites in the Western Hemisphere such as Cape Canaveral.

As a rule, dual nationals fly under a single flag when flying as professional spacecrew and/or when flying on government-operated spacecraft, and this is the flag they are listed under in the table. For the spaceflights of dual nationals who are private citizens flying on commercial spacecraft as ordinary passengers, the flags displayed are those of their countries of birth, unless the space traveller did not hold citizenship of that country and/or otherwise made clear (s)he intended to represent a different nationality.

Table

See also

 Human spaceflight
 List of astronauts by name
 List of astronauts by nationality
 List of fully civilian crewed suborbital spaceflights
 List of fully civilian crewed orbital spaceflights
 List of space travelers by name
 Spaceflight records
 Timeline of space travel by nationality

Notes

References

first flight